Mecca (also called East Mecca) is an unincorporated community in Trumbull County, in the U.S. state of Ohio.

History
A post office called Mecca was established in 1825, and remained in operation until 1904. The community was named after Mecca, in Saudi Arabia. In 1882, Mecca contained about a dozen houses.

References

Unincorporated communities in Trumbull County, Ohio
1825 establishments in Ohio
Populated places established in 1825
Unincorporated communities in Ohio